The Hermitage, also known as Tillery House, is a historic plantation house located near Tillery, Halifax County, North Carolina. It was built about 1810, and is a tripartite house that consists of a two-story, three bay, pedimented central block flanked by one-story, two bay, wings. An exterior end chimney rises at the end of each wing and at the rear of the very long central block.

It was listed on the National Register of Historic Places in 1975.

References

Plantation houses in North Carolina
Houses on the National Register of Historic Places in North Carolina
Houses completed in 1810
Houses in Halifax County, North Carolina
National Register of Historic Places in Halifax County, North Carolina